The Kolesov RD-36 was a supersonic turbojet engine used on various Soviet aircraft projects.

Design and development

Developed at OKB-36 (P. A. Kolesov) and produced at the Rybinsk Motor-Building Plant. The RD-36-51A engine was developed for the Tu-144D supersonic passenger aircraft. A simplified modification with a fixed nozzle for the high-altitude Myasishchev M-17 was designated RD-36-51B.
The RD36-51A engine passed all state bench and flight tests in 1973–75 (with flight testing on the Tu-144D). The engine's specifications were:
 Maximum thrust at take-off =  
 Maximum thrust during supersonic cruise =  altitude = , speed = 
 Maximum thrust during subsonic cruise=  altitude = , speed = 
 Temperature = 
 Diameter = 
 Length = 
 Mass = 
For the high-altitude  M-17 "Stratosphera" aircraft (NATO reporting name Mystic-A) a single-shaft TRD RD36-51B was created—a modification of the RD36-51A engine with an unregulated nozzle and oxygen supply to the combustion chamber.
 P = 
 With beats. vsl. = 0,88 kg / kgf • h.
RD-36-51A / B are released in a small series (about 50 pieces).

Variants
RD-36-41Created on the basis of the engine  'VD-19' .
Thrust – 
RD-36-51 This engine was a replacement for the Kuznetsov NK-144 turbofan used on the Tu-144D SST, giving an increase in full payload range from 3,080km to 5,330km. It is recognizable by the translating-plug variable-area nozzle. 
RD-36-51AThe RD-36-51A produced  thrust at take-off and had a cruise thrust-specific fuel consumption of 1.22 kg/(kgf. h). which gave the aircraft a maximum range of 6,500 km.
RD-36-51BNon-afterburning turbojet for use in high-altitude reconnaissance/research aircraft, such as the Myasishchev M-17 Stratosphera.

Applications 
 Tupolev Tu-148 (RD-36-41)
 Sukhoi T-4 (RD-36-41)
 Tupolev Tu-144D (RD-36-51A)
 Myasishchev M-17 Stratosphera (RD-36-51B)

Specifications (RD-36-51A)

See also

References

Soviet and Russian aircraft engines
1960s turbojet engines